Richard S. Becker (December 4, 1926 – January 5, 2015) was a United States Air Force flying ace during the Korean War, shooting down five enemy aircraft in the war.

See also
List of Korean War flying aces

References

Sources

1926 births
2015 deaths
American Korean War flying aces
Military personnel from Pennsylvania
People from Berks County, Pennsylvania
Recipients of the Distinguished Flying Cross (United States)
Recipients of the Silver Star
United States Air Force officers
United States Army Air Forces pilots of World War II